Anna Gerasimova (born 19 April 1961, Moscow), also known by her nickname Umka, is a Russian rock singer-songwriter, the leader of the group Umka and Bronevik. She is also a poet, literary translator, literature researcher, traveler, and a significant person in the Russian hippie movement.

Songs
Songs written and sung by Umka have become well-known among the Soviet hippies since 1986. In 1986–87 she recorded five homemade albums with different musicians, and these albums have been widely spread on tapes in the USSR and abroad.

In 1988 she stopped writing songs and switched to philological work and translations; in 1989 she defended her PhD dissertation about OBERIU literary group. In 1995 she returned to active song-writing and performing. She started to perform with occasional musicians in a number of concerts and recorded several homemade albums. Eventually her band has gained the name Bronevichok ("Small Armored Vehicle"; in 2005 the name was changed to Bronevik, "Armored Vehicle").

The first studio album by Umka & Bronevichok was released on tapes in 1997; the first compact disc titled The CD was released in 1998. In these years they have been generally considered as 'underground' musicians, though never willing to remain underground.

Since 1998 about 20 albums were released on CDs. Umka and her band travel extensively; they toured in many cities of the former USSR and many countries abroad (USA, United Kingdom, Israel, Germany, Netherlands). The total number of published songs is above 250; many songs were never released.

Literary translations
Literary and poetic translation was Anna Gerasimova's major field during her studies in the Maxim Gorky Literature Institute. She published translations from German, English, French, but mostly from Lithuanian (Tomas Venclova, Gintaras Patackas, Antanas A. Jonynas, Henrikas Radauskas).

Her most significant published translations include Jack Kerouac's The Dharma Bums (1994) and Big Sur (2002). She has also translated several autobiographic books and interviews of British and American rock musicians: Keith Richards, Iggy Pop, Frank Zappa, Maureen Tucker and others.

Philology and literary criticism
As a professional philologist, Gerasimova published scholarly articles on history of the Russian avant-garde literature, including the legacy of the OBERIU members Alexander Vvedensky, Daniil Kharms and Konstantin Vaginov. She has edited several publications of their previously unpublished works.

Personal life
Gerasimova was married to writer Yegor Radov from 1981 to 1986 with whom she has a son, Alexey Radov.

External links

 Official site (English)
 Official site (Russian)
 Autobiography
 Albums released on CDs (with mp3s and self-translations)
 Photo galleries:   
 Audio and video archive
 Umka and Boris. Live session on mastanmusic.com podcast

1961 births
Living people
Russian bards
Russian women singers
Russian rock singers
Russian women singer-songwriters
Singers from Moscow
Soviet songwriters
Maxim Gorky Literature Institute alumni